Henry Ritchie (18 February 1900 – 3 July 1941) was a Scottish footballer who played outside right for Hibernian, Everton, Dundee, St Johnstone, Brechin City and Scotland.

Career
Ritchie was born in Kirkcudbrightnand raised in Perth, the son of John Ritchie. He was a member of the Royal Navy Volunteer Reserve at the end of the First World War before graduating via the junior football ranks to become a mainstay for Hibs throughout the 1920s, and a full Scottish international. He played in the Scottish Cup finals of both 1923 and 1924, though finished on the losing side in both.

In August 1928, English First Division side Everton brought Ritchie down to England team up again alongside his former Easter Road and current international teammate and right-wing partner Jimmy Dunn who had made the same move some months earlier. Hopes were high that, together again, Dunn and Ritchie would rekindle the dazzling form they had displayed together at Hibs and supply further ammunition for legendary Toffees striker William Ralph 'Dixie' Dean, who had just scored his record-breaking 60 goals as Everton became League Champions for the third time in 1927–28.

Both players struggled initially at Goodison Park and, though Dunn would find his feet and go on to win League Championship and FA Cup medals with Everton, Ritchie would return to Scotland, signing for Dundee in February 1930, barely 18 months after his arrival on Merseyside; he went on to have a successful spell with hometown club St Johnstone.

Following the end of his football career, Ritchie worked in the dairy industry, at first back home in Perthshire, then in Nottingham, where he died at Nottingham General Hospital on 3 July 1941, following an operation. He was 41 years of age. He was buried at Carlton Cemetery, Nottingham, on 7 July 1941.

References

External links

1900 births
1941 deaths
Scottish footballers
Scotland international footballers
Hibernian F.C. players
Everton F.C. players
Dundee F.C. players
Brechin City F.C. players
Arbroath F.C. players
St Johnstone F.C. players
Scottish Junior Football Association players
Scottish Football League players
English Football League players
Scottish Football League representative players
Association football outside forwards
Footballers from Perth, Scotland
Royal Naval Volunteer Reserve personnel of World War I